An election to Donegal County Council took place on 23 May 2014 as part of that year's Irish local elections. 37 councillors were elected from five electoral divisions by PR-STV voting for a five-year term of office. In addition Ballyshannon Town Council, Bundoran Town Council and Letterkenny Town Council were all abolished.

The arrest of one candidate was ordered ahead of the election.

Gary Doherty of Sinn Féin and independent Frank McBrearty Jnr, a former county mayor and formerly of Labour, were the first candidates to be elected. Both were elected on the first count in the Stranorlar Electoral Area. Another candidate Ian McGarvey, who went into the election as Ireland's oldest Mayor, was re-elected in the Letterkenny Electoral Area. The count concluded in Letterkenny in the early hours of Monday 26 May, when Mick Quinn of Sinn Féin narrowly triumphed over independent Donal Cullen just after 5 am. Independents did well, according to local media in the Donegal LEA at the expense of both Fianna Fáil and Fine Gael and would increase their representation by 5 overall on the Council. Overall while Fianna Fáil made gains in Letterkenny and Glenties they lost a seat in Donegal compared to 2009. Michael Farren retained a solitary seat for Labour in Inishowen. Fine Gael lost 2 seats overall in the Donegal and Inishowen LEAs. Sinn Féin won a second seat in each LEA except Donegal.

Results by party
Results published here. (archive link)

Results by Electoral Area

Donegal

Glenties

Inishowen

Letterkenny

Stranorlar

Changes since 2014
† Letterkenny Sinn Féin Councillor Mick Quinn resigned on health grounds on 27 March 2017. Adrian Glackin was co-opted to fill the vacancy on 29 May 2017.
†† Donegal Fianna Fáil Councillor Sean McEniff died on 21 April 2017 following injuries sustained in an accident. At a convention on 16 July 2017 Micheál Naughton was selected to fill the vacancy.
††† Inishowen Fine Gael Councillor John Ryan resigned his seat on 15 May 2018 citing work commitments. A co-option will be made in due course. On 23 July 2018 Mickey Doherty was co-opted to fill the vacancy.
†††† Donegal Independent Councillor John Campbell resigned his seat for personal reasons on 8 January 2019. On 28 January 2019 Seamus Maguire was co-opted to fill the vacancy.

References

External links
 Official website

2014 Irish local elections
Donegal County Council elections